The Companion to Tasmanian History was a book produced in 2005 by the Centre for Tasmanian Historical Studies at the University of Tasmania, in conjunction with the Tasmanian Government celebrations of the Bicentenary of Tasmania.

The project to compile the volume began 2002 with an editorial committee comprising Michael Roe, Henry Reynolds, Stefan Petrow and Alison Alexander from the University of Tasmania, as well as Michael Sprod of Astrolabe Books, and Barbara Valentine from Launceston.

The alphabetical section contains some 1073 articles ranging through biographical sketches, places and issues that cover the whole length of Tasmanian history.

Thematic articles

Appendices
As well as the articles, the volume contains Appendices of Aboriginal places names, and all Government officials and members of Parliament since establishment of the colony.

Publication details

There was a digital version of the companion produced in 2006.

See also
History of Tasmania
Historical bibliographies of Tasmania
Historical Encyclopedia of WA

Notes

External links
 http://www.utas.edu.au/history_classics/Companion/CompaniontoTasmanianHistory.html
 http://www.bicentenary.tas.gov.au/page.php?id=71

History of Tasmania
2005 non-fiction books
History books about Australia
Books about Tasmania
Australian encyclopaedias